Liuta, also Ljuta (Ukrainian: Люта) is a small village located in the Uzhhorod Raion of Zakarpattia Oblast of Ukraine.

It is on the bank of the Liutianka River. The name of the village means snowyside/snowycorner because of the cold winters in the area. Its history dates back to 1599. The estimated population is under 4000 people.

Until 18 July 2020, Liuta belonged to Velykyi Bereznyi Raion. The raion was abolished in July 2020 as part of the administrative reform of Ukraine, which reduced the number of raions of Zakarpattia Oblast to six. The area of Velykyi Bereznyi Raion was merged into Uzhhorod Raion.

See also
 Carpathian Ruthenia
 Carpatho-Ukraine
 Rusyns

References

External links
 MultiMap (Current) http://uk2.multimap.com/M4/browse.cgi?scale=100000&lon=22.7667&lat=48.9000&icon=X
 Detailed map (1910 Ung) http://lazarus.elte.hu/hun/tantort/2003/palyazat/40-49_ungvar.jpg
 Further information http://www.fallingrain.com/world/UP/0/Lyuta.html

Villages in Uzhhorod Raion